Benedito Calixto de Jesus (14 October 1853 – 31 May 1927) was a Brazilian painter. His works usually depicted figures from Brazil and Brazilian culture, including a famous portrait of the bandeirante Domingos Jorge Velho in 1923, and scenes from the coastline of São Paulo. Unlike many artists of the time, Calixto's patron was an individual other than the state, who were "the most dependable source of patronage."

Gallery

See also

 Belém Museum of Art

References

1853 births
1927 deaths
People from Itanhaém
19th-century Brazilian painters
19th-century Brazilian male artists
20th-century Brazilian painters
20th-century Brazilian male artists
Brazilian cartographers